Blauer Samt (German for Blue velvet) is the debut album by German hip hop artist Torch. It released on September 2000 by the labels V2 Records and 360° Records.

On September 30, 2011, the album was re-released as CD and vinyl.

Blauer Samt is regarded as one of the most important German hip hop albums. The German rap albums Grüner Samt by Marsimoto (2012, “Green velvet”), Lila Samt by Sookee (2014, “Purple velvet”) and Normaler Samt by Audio88 & Yassin (2015, “Normal velvet”) are named after it.

Track listing

Samples

"Kapitel 29"
"A Life (1895 - 1915)" by Mark Hollis
"Gewalt oder Sex"
"It's a Man's Man's Man's World" by James Brown
"Wir waren mal Stars"
"Fantasy" by Maynard Ferguson
"Als ich zur Schule ging" 
"If Only We Knew" by John Handy
"The Bridge" by MC Shan
"Hey Mädel"
"Dreaming About You" by The Blackbyrds
"Ich hab geschrieben" 
"Water Moon" by Andreas Vollenweider
"Blauer Samt" 
"Sehr fern" by Klaus Kinski
"Allein" by Klaus Hoffmann
"Night Streets - Sandy and Jeffrey" by Angelo Badalamenti
"Heute Nacht"
"Long Red" (Live) by Mountain
"Morgen"
"Tomorrow Started" (Live) by Talk Talk

Personnel
Credits for Blauer Samt
Arranged By – Torch (tracks: A5, A6)
Producer – Boulevard Bou (tracks: B2, B5, C3), Torch (tracks: A1 to A3, A5, A6, B3, B4, B6 to C2, C4 to D5)
Recorded By, Mixed By – Boulevard Bou

References

Sources
Discogs.com
Whosampled.com

2000 albums
Torch (rapper) albums